KTTP (1110 AM) is a radio station broadcasting a Gospel format. Licensed to Pineville, Louisiana, United States, the station serves the Alexandria area. The station is currently owned by Martin Johnson and Anthony Brown, through licensee Radio Two, LLC. Much of the programming featured is from the Rejoice! Musical Soul Food satellite feed.

Because it shares the same frequency as "clear channel" stations KFAB in Omaha, Nebraska and WBT in Charlotte, North Carolina, KTTP only operates during the daytime hours.

History
The station was assigned the call letters KKLC on October 22, 1985.  On August 27, 1991, the station changed its call sign to KTLD; then on September 13, 2000, to the current callsign.

References

External links

Gospel radio stations in the United States
Mass media in Alexandria, Louisiana
Daytime-only radio stations in Louisiana
Christian radio stations in Louisiana